Bamboo shoot salad is a traditional Lao / Northeastern Thai (Isan) dish.

It is a popular dish, often sold alongside somtam in Thailand, and features sour, salty and hot tastes from lime, fish sauce, dried chilli and toasted rice. In addition to bamboo shoots, typical ingredients also include local herbs such as yanang (Tiliacora triandra), lemongrass and phak phaeo (Polygonum odoratum). It is traditionally eaten with warm sticky rice and grilled chicken (kai yang).

In Thailand, considerable confusion exists regarding the name of the dish, as sup, an Isan word describing this kind of spicy salad dish, is a homophone of the loanword for soup.

References 

Lao cuisine
Isan cuisine